is a Japanese musical group formed by Tomohiko Kira, Yoko Ueno, and Katushi Matsuda in 1985. The sound of Zabadak has been strongly influenced by both Celtic music and progressive. In 1993, Ueno and Matsuda left and Kira continued the group as a solo act still under the name Zabadak. Kira's partner and longtime support member Koko Komine joined in March 2011. Kira died on July 3, 2016 from an undisclosed cause at the age of 56.

Zabadak was named after a song by Dave Dee, Dozy, Beaky, Mick & Tich.
The main-belt asteroid 10566 Zabadak was named after the band.

Zabadak albums include collaborations and co-writes with American songwriter Cara Jones.

Discography

Albums

Studio albums
ZABADAK-I
Released March 20, 1986 by Toshiba-EMI
Gin no Sankaku (銀の三角)
Released February 4, 1987 by Toshiba-EMI
WATER GARDEN
Released August 26, 1987 by Toshiba-EMI
Welcome to Zabadak (ウェルカム・トゥ・ザバダック)
Released November 5, 1987 by Toshiba-EMI
Sora Tobu Yume (飛行夢)
Released November 1, 1989 by MMG
Tooi Ongaku (遠い音楽)
Released October 25, 1990 by MMG
ZABADAK
Released February 14, 1991 by Toshiba EMI
Watashi wa Hitsuji (私は羊)
Released October 25, 1991 by MMG
Juunigatsu no Gogo, Kawara de Boku wa Natsu no Fuukei o Omoidashiteita. (十二月の午後、河原で僕は夏の風景を思い出していた。)
Released July 13, 1992 by Biosphere Records
Sakura (桜)
Released January 25, 1993 by MMG
Oto (音)
Released October 25, 1994
SOMETHING IN THE AIR
Released September 11, 1996 by Polystar
Hikari Furu Asa (光降る朝)
Released October 14, 1996 by Polystar
TRiO
Released August 25, 1997 by Polystar
LiFE
Released September 18, 1997 by Polystar
Hachimitsu Hakusho (はちみつ白書)
Released September 2, 1998 by Polystar
iKON ~Tooi Tabi no Nikki~ (iKON ～遠い旅の記憶～)
Released January 20, 2000 by Biosphere Records
Kaze o Tsugu Mono (風を継ぐ者)
Released April 8, 2001 by Nevula Project
COLORS
Released November 1, 2001 by Gargoyle
Blizzard Music (ブリザード・ミュージック)
Released November 24, 2001 by Nevula Project
SIGNAL
Released November 7, 2002 by Gargoyle
Wonderful Life
Released January 22, 2004 by Gargoyle
Sora no Iro (空ノ色)
Released November 11, 2004 by Gargoyle
Kaiten Gekijou (回転劇場)
Released March 14, 2007 by Gargoyle
Heikou Sekai (平行世界)
Released February 15, 2009 by Gargoyle
Kakenukeru Kaze no you ni -Original Soundtrack for "Kaze o Tsugi Mono" 2009- (駆け抜ける風のように -Original Soundtrack for『風を継ぐ者』2009-)
Released August 4, 2009 by Nevula Project
Hito (ひと)
Released March 14, 2011 by Gargoyle
Inochi no Kioku (いのちの記憶)
Released April 8, 2013 by Gargoyle
Лето јесен зима пролеће - 夏　秋　冬　春 -
Released June 15, 2013 by Gargoyle

Compilation albums
Souseiki ~The Best of Zabadak~ (創世紀 ～ザ・ベスト・オブ・ザバダック～)
Released June 24, 1992 by Toshiba-EMI
decade
Released September 25, 1993 by MMG
remains
Released August 25, 1996 by Biosphere Records
Pieces of The Moon
Released October 35, 1996 by MMG
Souseiki +2 (創世紀 +2)
Released December 11, 1996 by Toshiba-EMI
STORIES
Released September 15, 1999 by Polystar
Christmas Songs (クリスマスソングス)
Released December 8, 2004 by Gargoyle
20th
Released July 19, 2006 by Polystar
Re-released January 20, 2010 by Universal Music
CARAMELBOX SOUNDBOOK [GREEN]
Released July 11, 2009 by Nevula Project

Rearrange albums
Saito NEKO quartet plays ZABADAK with KIRA tomohiko
Released October 1, 2000 by Biosphere Records
Uchuu no Radio (宇宙のラジヲ)
Released September 19, 2007 by Gargoyle

Live albums
Live (ライブ)
Released April 25, 1991 by MMG
prunus
Released August 20, 1994 by Biosphere Records
wonderful live 2004.3.5 @ club citta'& signal live 2003.1.11 @ nakano zero
Released August 2004 by Gargoyle

Singles
"Bi Chance -Ayashii Ronde-" (美チャンス－妖しい輪舞－)
Released September 25, 1987 by Toshiba-EMI
"Mizu no Runesu / Seraphita" (水のルネス／シェラフィータ)
Released October 5, 1987 by Toshiba-EMI
"FOLLOW YOUR DREAMS"
Released March 10, 1989 by MMG
"LET THERE BE LIGHT"
Released June 25, 1989 by MMG
"harvest rain (Houjou no Ame)" (harvest rain （豊穣の雨）)
Released June 25, 1990 by MMG
"Tooi Ongaku" (遠い音楽)
Released September 25, 1990 by MMG
"Shiiba no Harubushi" (椎葉の春節)
Released January 25, 1993 by MMG
"MERRY GO ROUND Mitai na Kimi" (MERRY GO ROUNDみたいな君)
Released September 2, 1998 by Polystar
"Kaachibai" (夏至南風(カーチバイ))
Released October 28, 2000 by penelope

Videos
live
Released April 25, 1991 by MMG (VHS/LD)
noren wake
Released December 5, 1993 by Biosphere Records (VHS)
Re-released February 14, 2005 (DVD)
noren wake ...plus
Released May 5, 1994 by Biosphere Records (LD)
"OTO" LIVE 12.28,1994 at ON AIR WEST TOKYO
Released December 25, 1995 by Zabadak Office(VHS)
Re-released February 14, 2005 (DVD)
Zabadak 10566
Released November 12, 2000 by Biosphere Records (VHS)
Re-released February 14, 2005 (DVD)
CARAMELBOX PRESENTS ZABADAK ACOUSTIC LIVE
Released July 14, 2002 by Gargoyle (VHS)
Still I'm fine
Released January 11, 2003 by Gargoyle (VHS)
biosphere years 1988-2000 zabadak special DVD box
Released June 30, 2003 by Biosphere Records
Contains:
noren wake
"OTO" LIVE 12.28,1994 at ON AIR WEST TOKYO
Zabadak 10566
1986-1993 SPECIAL EDITION
"trio" at ON AIR EAST 1997.6.1
1986-1993 SPECIAL EDITION
Released February 14, 2005 by Biosphere Records (DVD)
"trio" at ON AIR EAST 1997.6.1
Released February 14, 2005 by Biosphere Records (DVD)
ZABADAK 2006~2007@CLUB CITTA'''
Released September 20, 2007 by Gargoyle (DVD)ZABADAK a ParisReleased July 19, 2008 by Gargoyle (DVD)ZABADAK Shinshun Gekkouyakai''　(ZABADAK 新春月光夜會)
Released June 24, 2010 by Gargoyle (DVD)

References

External links
Official Homepage 

Japanese rock music groups
Japanese progressive rock groups